Dorcadion kraetschmeri is a species of beetle in the family Cerambycidae. It was described by Bernhauer in 1988. It is known from Turkey.

References

kraetschmeri
Beetles described in 1988